Emperor Henry may refer to:

 Henry the Fowler (876–936), King of Germany but Holy Roman Emperors were numbered as if he had been Emperor
 Henry II, Holy Roman Emperor (972–1024)
 Henry III, Holy Roman Emperor (1017–1056)
 Henry IV, Holy Roman Emperor (1050–1106)
 Henry V, Holy Roman Emperor (1081–1125)
 Henry VI, Holy Roman Emperor (1165–1197)
 Henry VII, Holy Roman Emperor, (c. 1274–1313)
 Henry of Flanders (c. 1174–1216), Latin Emperor of Constantinople